The 1963 African Cup of Nations was the fourth edition of the Africa Cup of Nations, the association football championship of Africa (CAF). For the third consecutive time the hosts won the African Cup. The format was changed to two groups of 3 teams each, with the group winners playing the final, and the runners-up playing the third place playoff. The final in Accra on 1 December saw the hosts beating Sudan 3–0 to win the title.

This tournament, and the previous one, are the only Africa Cup of Nations tournaments with more than four goals-per-game average.

Qualified teams

Squads

Venues 
The competition was played in two venues in Accra and Kumasi.

Group stage

Group A

Group B

Knockout stage

Third place match

Final

Scorers 
6 goals
  Hassan El-Shazly

4 goals

  Edward Acquah
  Nasr Eddin "Jaksa" Abbas
  Riza

2 goals

  Mengistu Worku
  Mohamed Salah Jedidi

1 goal

  Edward Aggrey-Fynn
  Wilberforce Mfum
  Ibrahim Yahia El-Kawarty
  Abdelaziz Ibrahim Adam
  Ezz El-Din Yaqoub
  Girma Tekle
  Girma Tesfaye
  Abdelmajid Chetali
  Joseph Bassey
  Asuquo Ekpe
  Albert Onyeawuna

External links 
 Details at RSSSF

 
Nations
International association football competitions hosted by Ghana
Sport in Accra
Africa Cup of Nations tournaments
Africa Cup of Nations
Africa Cup of Nations
1963 in Ghanaian sport